Henry J. Seibert II House, also known as "Seibert Villa," is a historic home located near Martinsburg, Berkeley County, West Virginia. It was built in 1867, and is a two-story, "L"-shaped brick dwelling in the Late Greek Revival-style.  It measures 36 feet wide by 76 feet long and sits on a stone foundation. It features a three bay, one story hip roof porch added about 1890.  Also on the property are two contributing outbuildings.

It was listed on the National Register of Historic Places in 1985.

References

Houses on the National Register of Historic Places in West Virginia
Greek Revival houses in West Virginia
Houses completed in 1867
Houses in Berkeley County, West Virginia
National Register of Historic Places in Berkeley County, West Virginia